Esko Aatu Rekomaa (December 24, 1932 – February 14, 1985) was professional ice hockey player who played in the SM-liiga. Born in Vuoksela, Finland, he played for HIFK. He was inducted into the Finnish Hockey Hall of Fame in 1986.

External links
 Finnish Hockey Hall of Fame bio

1932 births
1985 deaths
Ice hockey players at the 1952 Winter Olympics
Olympic ice hockey players of Finland
People from Priozersky District
HIFK (ice hockey) players